Protomeroleuca is a monotypic genus of moths of the family Noctuidae. It contains only the species Protomeroleuca perlides from Madagascar.

References
Berio, E. 1966e. Descrizione di nuove Noctuidae Africane e note sinonimiche. - Annali del Museo Civico di Storia Naturale di Genova 76:110–136.

Hadeninae
Moths of Madagascar
Owlet moths of Africa
Noctuoidea genera
Monotypic moth genera